The Steamexfire is a high flow inert gas generator (IGG).

Principle
The Steamexfire is driven by a jet engine, in which air is compressed into a combustion chamber where fuel (kerosene) is injected. The flammable mixture of fuel and air is ignited by a sparkplug, and the gases expand as a result of the combustion process. The gases are forced into a turbine which drives a compressor.
The exhaust gas of a jet engine contains approx. 17% oxygen .
In a second stage combustion chamber, more fuel is injected and ignited. As a result of this process, all oxygen is consumed, and what remains is an inert gas.
This process takes place in a 7 meter long combustion tube, which is cooled by water. The heated water is injected at the end of the cooling tube, and consequently the water is turned into water vapor and steam.
As a result, the Steamexfire produces up to 25 cubic meters of inert steam and water vapor per second.
The fore runner of the Steamexfire is called the GAG unit.

Underground mine fires
The Steamexfire has been deployed to fight underground mine fires at the Goedehoop mine fire in South Africa and at the Svea Nord mine fire on Spitsbergen Island.

External links
Product website from manufacturer

Coal mining
Fire suppression
Firefighting equipment